Yiannis Nicholas Moschovakis (born January 18, 1938) is a set theorist, descriptive set theorist, and recursion (computability) theorist, at UCLA.

His book Descriptive Set Theory (North-Holland) is the primary reference for the subject. He is especially associated with the development of the effective, or lightface, version of descriptive set theory, and he is known for the Moschovakis coding lemma that is named after him.

Biography
Moschovakis earned his Ph.D. from the University of Wisconsin–Madison in 1963 under the direction of Stephen Kleene, with a dissertation entitled Recursive Analysis. In 2015, he was elected as a fellow of the American Mathematical Society "for contributions to mathematical logic, especially set theory and computability theory, and for exposition".

For many years, he has split his time between UCLA and the University of Athens (he retired from the latter in July 2005).

Moschovakis is married to Joan Moschovakis, with whom he gave the 2014 Lindström Lectures at the University of Gothenburg.

Publications
  
   Second edition available online

References

External links
 Home page
 

Living people
20th-century American mathematicians
American logicians
Greek logicians
Academic staff of the National and Kapodistrian University of Athens
Set theorists
University of California, Los Angeles faculty
1938 births
Tarski lecturers
Fellows of the American Mathematical Society
People from Athens